Elijah Hood (born April 22, 1996) is a former American football running back. He played college football at North Carolina.

Early years
Hood attended Charlotte Catholic High School in Charlotte, North Carolina, where he played high school football and became an Eagle Scout. As a senior, he won the Hall Trophy as the U.S. Army Player of the Year. During the season, he rushed for 3,690 yards and 53 touchdowns. He finished his career with 8,981 yards and 147 touchdowns. He was ranked by Rivals.com as the fourth best running back recruit in his class. He originally committed to the University of Notre Dame but changed his mind and chose to attend the University of North Carolina at Chapel Hill.

Professional career

Oakland Raiders
Hood was drafted by the Oakland Raiders in the seventh round, 242nd overall, in the 2017 NFL Draft. He was the last of six North Carolina Tar Heels to be drafted that year. He was waived on September 2, 2017 and was signed to the Raiders' practice squad the next day. He was promoted to the active roster on October 25, 2017. He was waived by the Raiders on October 30, 2017 and re-signed to the practice squad. He signed a reserve/future contract with the Raiders on January 2, 2018. He was waived by the Raiders on May 7, 2018.

Carolina Panthers
On May 8, 2018, Hood was claimed off waivers by the Carolina Panthers. Due to a knee injury from a preseason game at Pittsburgh, he was placed on injured reserve on September 1, 2018.

On February 25, 2019, Hood signed a one-year contract to remain with the Panthers. He was waived on July 24, 2019.

Jacksonville Jaguars
On August 17, 2019, Hood was signed by the Jacksonville Jaguars. He was waived on August 31, 2019.

Los Angeles Wildcats
In October 2019, Hood was drafted by the Los Angeles Wildcats in the 2020 XFL Draft. He had his contract terminated when the league suspended operations on April 10, 2020.

References

External links
North Carolina Tar Heels bio

1996 births
Living people
Players of American football from Charlotte, North Carolina
American football running backs
North Carolina Tar Heels football players
Oakland Raiders players
Carolina Panthers players
Jacksonville Jaguars players
Los Angeles Wildcats (XFL) players